Imeni Sverdlova may refer to:
Imeni Sverdlova, Kazakhstan, a village in Almaty Province, Kazakhstan
Imeni Sverdlova, Russia, an urban-type settlement in Leningrad Oblast, Russia